Eva Melicharová and Helena Vildová were the defending champions but they competed with different partners that year, Melicharova with Cătălina Cristea and Vildova with Karina Habšudová.

Habšudová and Vildova lost in the first round to Amanda Coetzer and Sandrine Testud.

Cristea and Melicharova lost in the final 6–7(4–7), 7–6(8–6), 7–6(7–5) against Sabine Appelmans and Miriam Oremans.

Seeds
Champion seeds are indicated in bold text while text in italics indicates the round in which those seeds were eliminated.

 Sabine Appelmans /  Miriam Oremans (champions)
 Debbie Graham /  Kimberly Po (first round)
 Florencia Labat /  Dominique Van Roost (quarterfinals)
 Ruxandra Dragomir /  Corina Morariu (quarterfinals)

Draw

References

External links
 Official results archive (ITF)
 Official results archive (WTA)

Women's Doubles
Doubles